A stock character is a dramatic or literary character representing a generic type in a conventional, simplified manner and recurring in many fictional works. The following list labels some of these stereotypes and provides examples. Some character archetypes, the more universal foundations of fictional characters, are also listed. Some characters that were first introduced as fully fleshed-out characters become subsequently used as stock characters in other works (e.g., the Ebenezer Scrooge character from A Christmas Carol, upon whom the miserly Scrooge type is based). Some stock characters incorporate more than one stock character; for example, a bard may also be a wisecracking jester. Some of the stock characters in this list may be considered offensive due to their use of racial stereotyping.

A

B

C

D

E

F

G

H

I

J

K

L

M

N

O

P

Q

R

S

T

U

V

W

Y

Z

See also
 Commedia dell'arte
 Stereotype

References